John McGowan (November 5, 1845 – October 20, 1922) was an Ontario businessman, farmer and political figure. He represented Wellington North in the Legislative Assembly of Ontario from 1874 to 1879 and Wellington Centre in the House of Commons of Canada as a Liberal-Conservative member from 1901 to 1904.

He was born in Greenock, Scotland in 1845 and came to Canada West with his parents in 1857. He settled in Peel Township (now part of Mapleton Township) and served as reeve there. He also managed a linseed oil mill in Elora. He was elected to the Ontario legislature in an 1874 by-election and was reelected in 1875. He was elected to the House of Commons in 1900, and served for four years.

References

External links
 
 

1845 births
1922 deaths
Conservative Party of Canada (1867–1942) MPs
Immigrants to the Province of Canada
Members of the House of Commons of Canada from Ontario
People from Greenock
People from Wellington County, Ontario
Progressive Conservative Party of Ontario MPPs
Scottish emigrants to pre-Confederation Ontario